The 50th Golden Globe Awards, honoring the best in film and television for 1992, were held on Saturday January 23, 1993 at the Beverly Hilton. The nominations were announced on December 29, 1992.

Winners and nominees

Film 

The following films received multiple nominations:

The following films received multiple wins:

Television 
The following  programs received multiple nominations:

The following programs received multiple wins:

Ceremony

Presenters 

 Richard Dean Anderson
 Anne Archer
 Rosanna Arquette
 Dan Aykroyd
 Drew Barrymore
 Kathy Bates
 Corbin Bernsen
 Jon Bon Jovi
 Beau Bridges
 Matthew Broderick
 Carol Burnett
 Diahann Carroll
 Richard Chamberlain
 James Coburn
 Harry Connick, Jr.
 Catherine Deneuve
 Amanda Donohoe
 Jodie Foster
 Teri Garr
 Marilu Henner
 Anthony Hopkins
 Christine Lahti
 Michele Lee
 Jay Leno
 John Lithgow
 Reba McEntire
 Bette Midler
 Sarah Jessica Parker
 Gregory Peck
 Victoria Principal
 Tom Selleck
 Cybill Shepherd
 Tom Skerritt
 Christian Slater
 Peter Strauss
 Patrick Swayze
 Jean-Claude Van Damme

Cecil B. DeMille Award 
Lauren Bacall

Special Achievement Award 
Robin Williams – For his vocal role work as the Genie in Aladdin.

Awards breakdown 
The following networks received multiple nominations:

The following networks received multiple wins:

See also
 65th Academy Awards
 13th Golden Raspberry Awards
 44th Primetime Emmy Awards
 45th Primetime Emmy Awards
 46th British Academy Film Awards
 47th Tony Awards
 1992 in film
 1992 in American television

References

050
1992 film awards
1992 television awards
January 1993 events in the United States
Golden